The  6th United States Army Group was an Allied army group that fought in the European Theater of Operations during World War II.  Made up of field armies from both the United States Army and the French Army, it fought in France, Germany, Austria, and, briefly, Italy. Also referred to as the Southern Group of Armies, it was established in July 1944 and commanded throughout its duration by General Jacob L. Devers.

In a lead role in Operation Undertone, its Seventh Army fought its way across the Rhine into Germany, captured Nuremberg and then Munich. Finally it crossed the Brenner Pass and made contact with the US Fifth Army at Vipiteno, Italy.

History
The Sixth Army Group was originally created in Corsica, France (specifically activated on 29 July 1944) as "Advanced Allied Force HQ", a special headquarters within AFHQ (the headquarters of Henry Maitland Wilson, the Supreme Commander Mediterranean Theatre) commanded by Lieutenant General Jacob L. Devers. Its initial role was to supervise the planning of the combined French and American forces which invaded southern France in Operation Dragoon and provide liaison between these forces and AFHQ. Dragoon was the operational responsibility of the Seventh United States Army commanded by Lt. Gen. Alexander Patch. Available to Patch were three corps (US VI Corps and French I and II Corps) and 24,000 Maquis of the Forces Francaises de l'Interieur. The two French corps constituted French Army B commanded by Général Jean de Lattre de Tassigny which was later renamed French First Army. Although Sixth Army Group Headquarters was officially activated on 1 August, it consisted of only the personnel of the Advanced Detachment AFHQ and, for reasons of security, retained the detachment title. The Advanced Detachment headquarters on Corsica had no command or operational duties and functioned primarily as a liaison and coordinating agency while preparing itself for the day it would become operational in France as Sixth Army Group headquarters.

Devers' headquarters remained subordinate to AFHQ during the invasion and in the weeks immediately afterwards while operational control of the troops on the ground resided with Patch until his forces linked near Dijon, France, with Twelfth United States Army Group's Third Army advancing from the west after breaking out of the Normandy beachhead. At this time, on 15 September, Devers' headquarters was designated Sixth Army Group to take operational control of Seventh Army and French Army B and came under the overall command of General Dwight D. Eisenhower, the Supreme Commander at SHAEF (Supreme Headquarters, Allied Expeditionary Forces).

In late 1944 and early 1945 the Sixth Army Group was involved in fierce fighting in the Alsace repelling the German advance during Operation Nordwind and subsequent pitched engagements closing off the Colmar Pocket.  The 63rd Infantry Division was the first Seventh Army unit to cross the Siegfried Line, and the first to get an entire division through it. The 3rd Infantry Division suffered the highest casualty count of all US divisions, with over 27,000 casualties.

The Army Group later advanced through Bavaria, and eventually into western Austria in the waning days of the war. Elements of Sixth Army Group linked up south of the Brenner Pass on 4 May 1945 with troops of the Fifth United States Army of the Allied 15th Army Group advancing north from Italy.  Germany surrendered on 9 May 1945.

The Sixth Army Group effectively inactivated on 15 June 1945 when the US Seventh Army was selected, along with the Third Army, to form the occupation forces of Germany.  It remained as an occupation and defensive force in southern Germany into the early 21st Century. It also occupied part of Austria until that country was released from occupation in the mid-1950s.

The French First Army reverted to the control of the provisional French government shortly after the surrender of Germany.

Devers relinquished command of the Sixth Army Group in late June 1945 when he was selected to take command of the Army Ground Forces in lieu of General Joseph Stilwell who was reassigned as commander of the Tenth United States Army following the death of General Simon Bolivar Buckner, Jr.

The Sixth Army Group was officially inactivated on 20 July 1945.

Order of battle – 8 May 1945

Order of battle shifted frequently in the Sixth Army Group, but accelerated dramatically during its late-war push through southern Bavaria into the Austrian Alps to head off German establishment of a National Redoubt and close off passes to Nazi escape.  Order of Battle on 8 May represents a significantly different disposition in some instances than in the weeks and even days leading up to it.

  6th Army Group – General Jacob L. Devers
  Seventh Army – Lieutenant General Alexander M. Patch
  12th Armored Division – Major General Roderick R. Allen
  45th Infantry Division – Major General Robert T. Frederick
  63rd Infantry Division – Major General Louis E. Hibbs
  100th Infantry Division – Major General Withers A. Burress
  VI Corps – Major General Edward H. Brooks
  10th Armored Division – Major General William H. H. Morris, Jr.
  44th Infantry Division – Major General William F. Dean
  103rd Infantry Division – Major General Anthony C. McAuliffe
  XV Corps – Major General Wade H. Haislip
  3rd Infantry Division – Major General John W. O'Daniel
  20th Armored Division – Major General Orlando Ward
  42nd Infantry Division – Major General Harry J. Collins
  86th Infantry Division – Major General Harris M. McLaskey
  XXI Corps – Major General Frank W. Milburn
  French 2nd Armored Division – Major General Philippe Leclerc
  36th Infantry Division – Major General John E. Dahlquist
  101st Airborne Division – Major General Maxwell D. Taylor
  French First Army – General Jean de Lattre de Tassigny
 French 1st Corps – Lieutenant General Antoine Béthouart
  French 2nd Moroccan Infantry Division – Brigadier General François de Linarès
  French 4th Moroccan Mountain Division – Major General Rene de Hasdin
  French 9th Colonial Infantry Division – Brigadier General Jean-Étienne Valluy
  French 10th Infantry Division   – Brigadier General Pierre Billotte
  French 1st Armored Division  – Brigadier General Aime Sudre
 French 2nd Corps – Lieutenant General Joseph de Goislard de Monsabert
  French 1st Motorised Infantry Division – Brigadier General Pierre Garbay 
  French 1st Infantry Division  – Brigadier General Jean Callies
  French 3rd Algerian Infantry Division – Major General Augustin Guillaume
  French 14th Infantry Division – Brigadier General Raoul Salan
  French 5th Armored Division  – Brigadier General Guy Schlesser
 Detachment Army of the Alps  – Lieutenant General Paul Doyen
  French 27th Alpine Infantry Division  – Colonel Jean Vallette d'Osia

See also
Colmar Pocket
Operation Dragoon
Western Allied invasion of Germany

Citations and notes

References

Further reading
 Harry Yeide, Mark Stout, First to the Rhine: The 6th Army Group in World War II, Zenith Press, 2007 
 Decision at Strasbourg by David Colley. In November 1944, the 6th Army Group reached the Rhine river at Strasbourg, France. Lt. General Jacob Devers wanted to cross the Rhine into Germany but the plan was vetoed by General Eisenhower. http://www.armchairgeneral.com/decision-at-strasbourg-book-review.htm
 "How World War II Wasn’t Won" – Op Ed NY Times, David Colley https://www.nytimes.com/2009/11/23/opinion/23colley.html

External links
 Narrative History of the 6th Army Group, SHAEF, Dwight D. Eisenhower Presidential Library

06
Military units and formations established in 1944
Military units and formations disestablished in 1945